Lincoln F. Pratson is an American geologist currently the Truman and Nellie Semans/Alex Brown & Sons Professor of Earth and Ocean Sciences at Duke University.

References

Year of birth missing (living people)
Living people
Duke University faculty
21st-century American engineers
Place of birth missing (living people)